Events from the year 1863 in Sweden

Incumbents
 Monarch – Charles XV

Events

 1863–1864: Rudberg and Gillis Bildt develop a city plan for Stockholm.  Albert Lindhagen is appointed head of a commission to examine the plan the following year, only to produce a plan of his own in 1866. The plan, published in 1867, results in no actions.
 - Inauguration of Berns Salonger in Stockholm. 
 - Foundation of Skandinaviska Banken.
 - Alfred Nobel invents dynamite.
 - Foundation of the Alfred Berg company.
 - The Risbergska skolan is founded.
 - Danviken Hospital is closed. 
 - The Post- and telegraph professions are opened to women.
 7 August - Johanna Hedén becomes the first licensed female surgeon by passing her exam as feldsher.

Births

 15 December – Axel Danielsson, socialist agitator, journalist and writer (died 1899) 
 11 March - Amanda Christensen, business person  (died 1928)

Deaths

References

 
Years of the 19th century in Sweden
Sweden